Balduin Sulzer (Cistercians) (as Josef Sulzer (15 March 1932  – 10 April 2019) was an Austrian Roman Catholic priest. He became known as a music educator and composer.

Life 
Sulzer was born in Großraming. At the age of ten Sulzer came to Linz, where he attended grammar school. He sang as an altar boy in the New Cathedral, Linz in the "Domschola" under the direction of  Josef Kronsteiner. After the Matura, he joined the religious order of the Cistercians in Wilhering Abbey in 1949 and received the religious name "Balduin". He began his philosophical-theological studies in Linz and Rome, as well as studying history at the University of Vienna. He completed his musical education at the Bruckner Conservatory in Linz, at the Pontifical Institute of Sacred Music in Rome and at the University of Music and Performing Arts Vienna, among others with Hans Gillesberger.

In 1955, Balduin Sulzer received the priesthood ordination. From 1959 to 1977, he was a music teacher at the Wilhering Abbey, where he led the Wilhering Boys' Choir and the Wilhering Kantorei. From 1974 to 1997, Sulzer was a music professor at the Linzer Musikgymnasium. He was also répétiteur at Linz's Anton Bruckner Private University and cathedral conductor. Franz Welser-Möst studied composition with Sulzer, the tenor Kurt Azesberger and the soprano Anna Maria Pammer were also his pupils. Sulzer was the founder and musical director of the Linz Music High School, where he worked from 1974 until his retirement in 1997.

Sulzer lived and worked at Wilhering Abbey, where he also served as Stiftskapellmeister.

Sulzer died in Linz at the age of 87.

Works 
Sulzer's oeuvre comprises over 400 works, including four operas, children's musicals, nine symphonies, a passion, twelve instrumental concertos, piano and chamber music as well as Lieder and choral music.

Awards 
 1970: Förderungspreis des Landes Oberösterreich für Komposition
 1977: Kulturpreis des Landes Oberösterreich für Musik
 1979: Förderungspreis vom Amt der Oberösterreichischen Landesregierung
 1984: Kulturmedaille der Stadt Linz
 1992: Goldenes Ehrenzeichen vom Tiroler Sängerbund
 1993: Heinrich Gleißner Prize
 1996:
 Anton Bruckner Prize (Großer Kulturpreis des Landes Oberösterreich)
 Kunstwürdigungspreis der Stadt Linz
 Ehrenring der Marktgemeinde Wilhering
 
 2007: Kulturmedaille der Stadt Linz
 2011: Goldenes Ehrenzeichen für Verdienste um die Republik Österreich
 2012: Ehrenbürger of the Marktgemeinde Wilhering

References

Further reading 
 Norbert Trawöger: Balduin Sulzer. Medienkombination Buch und CD, Trauner Verlag, Linz 2010, .
 Sulzer Balduin on OeML

External links 
 
 
 Werke von Balduin Sulzer on musicaustria.at
 
 

Cistercians
20th-century Austrian Roman Catholic priests
20th-century Austrian composers
20th-century Austrian male musicians
Austrian music educators
20th-century hymnwriters
Austrian opera composers
1932 births
2019 deaths
People from Steyr-Land District